Kaina is a small hillock located in the Indian state Manipur, that is sacred to Hindus. It is said to be the place where King Bhagya Chandra received an epiphany to carve a statue of Lord Govinda from a  sacred jackfruit tree.

In 2014, the government of Manipur announced intentions to initiate a project to convert the place to a Mega Tourist Spot.

See also
Sacred Jackfruit Tree, Kaina

References

Hills of Manipur